Nickelodeon is an Israeli children's television channel launched on 1 July 2003. On 2 May 2010, Nickelodeon Israel rebranded on September 2009.

Programming

Israel original shows 

 Shchuna (שכונה) – In English, "Neighborhood".
 HaHamama (החממה) – The original show of Netflix's The "Greenhouse Academy".
 HaTzhokia (הצחוקייה) – A kids stand-up show with Israel's most popular comedians.
 Neelamin (נעלמים) – In English, "Vanished".
 Betzefer (בצפר)- A Hebrew slang commonly used by students, for the word "Beit-Sefer". In English, it means "School".
 Kadabra (כדברא) – In English, "Spell keeprs".
 Yapanick (יפניק) A kids wipeout type show, in which classes from all over the countries compete to win a prize.
 Championsnick (צ'מפיונסניק) – A game show between schools from all over the country to win a trip to Barcelona.
 Forever (פוראבר) – In English, "forever".
 Spyders (ספיידרז) – In English, "the Spyders".
 Gan Hayot (גן חיות) – A kid's sketch comedy show taking place in a fictional zoo called "Gancha".
 Ziggy (זיגי) – A 16-year-old with vitiligo struggles with self-confidence as he pursues his dream of being a performer.

Current

 Best & Bester (October 9, 2022 – present)
 Big Nate (September 22, 2022 – present)
 The Casagrandes (22 March 2020 – present)
 It's Pony (10 May 2020 – present)
 Kamp Koral: SpongeBob's Under Years (1 September 2021 – present)
 Middlemost Post (October 17, 2021 – present)
 Monster High (February 6, 2023 – present)
 Rugrats (2021) (July 22, 2022 – present)
 SpongeBob SquarePants (1 July 2003–present)
 Star Trek: Prodigy (5 November 2022–present)
 The Loud House (15 May 2016 – present)
 The Patrick Star Show (October 17, 2021 – present)
 The Smurfs (2021)

Upcoming
 Fairy Express

Former

 44 Cats
 Aaahh!!! Real Monsters
 Action League Now!
 All Grown Up!
 All That
 Alvinnn!!! and the Chipmunks
 As Told by Ginger
 Avatar: The Last Airbender
 Back at the Barnyard
 Bakugan Battle Planet
 Beyblade Burst
 Bolts and Blip 
 Breadwinners
 Bunsen is a Beast 
 CatDog
 Catscratch
 ChalkZone
 Clarissa Explains It All
 Cousin Skeeter
 Danny Phantom
 Daria 
 Delilah and Julius
 Dorg Van Dango
 Dr. Zitbag's Transylvania Pet Shop
 Dragon Ball Super
 Drake & Josh
 El Tigre: The Adventures of Manny Rivera
 Fanboy & Chum Chum
 Fatherhood 
 Frankenstein's Cat
 Gasp! 
 Get Blake! 
 Girls v. Boys
 The Gnoufs
 Harvey Beaks
 Hero Factory 
 Hey Arnold!
 House of Anubis
 Invader Zim
 Johnny Test
 Just for Kicks
 Just Jordan 
 KaBlam!
 Kappa Mikey
 Kenan & Kel
 Kung Fu Panda: Legends of Awesomeness
 Legends of Chima 
 Lego Friends
 Lego Star Wars: The Yoda Chronicles
 Make It Pop
 Monsters vs. Aliens
 Monsuno
 Mr. Meaty
 My Life as a Teenage Robot
 Naturally, Sadie 
 Ned's Declassified School Survival Guide
 The Nick Cannon Show
 Ninjago 
 Noah Knows Best
 O'Grady 
 Oh Yeah! Cartoons
 Ollie's Pack
 Pirate Family
 Pitt and Kantrop
 Planet Sheen
 Power Rangers Beast Morphers
 Power Rangers Dino Fury
 Rabbids Invasion
 Rainbow Butterfly Unicorn Kitty (9 February 2020 – 2020)
 Random! Cartoons 
 Renford Rejects
 Ricky Sprocket: Showbiz Boy
 Rise of the Teenage Mutant Ninja Turtles
 Road Rules 
 Robot and Monster
 Rocket Monkeys
 Rocket Power
 Rocko's Modern Life
 Romeo! 
 Rugrats
 Sam & Cat
 Samson and Neon 
 Sanjay and Craig
 Scaredy Camp
 Skyland
 T.U.F.F. Puppy
 Tak and the Power of Juju
 Team Hot Wheels
 Teenage Mutant Ninja Turtles
 The Adventures of Jimmy Neutron: Boy Genius
 The Adventures of Kid Danger
 The Adventures of Pete & Pete
 The Amanda Show
 The Angry Beavers
 The Brothers Garcia
 The Fairly OddParents
 The Journey of Allen Strange
 The Legend of Korra
 The Mighty B!
 The Naked Brothers Band
 The Penguins of Madagascar
 The Ren & Stimpy Show 
 The Wild Thornberrys
 The X's
 ToonMarty 
 Transformers: Robots in Disguise
 Transformers: Cyberverse
 Trollz
 Unfabulous
 Vampires, Pirates & Aliens
 Wayside
 Welcome to the Wayne
 Winx Club
 Yakkity Yak
 Zoey 101

Nick Jr. series (2007–2012)

 Ben & Holly's Little Kingdom
 Blue's Clues
 Bubble Guppies
 Dora the Explorer
 Go, Diego, Go!
 Little Bill
 Ni Hao, Kai-Lan
 Oobi
 Team Umizoomi
 Tickety Toc
 Wonder Pets

TeenNick series (2013–2017)

 100 Things To Do Before High School
 Big Time Rush
 Bella and the Bulldogs
 Degrassi: The Next Generation
 Every Witch Way
 Fred: The Show
 Game Shakers (19 October 2016 – 2019)
 Henry Danger
 How to Rock
 Instant Mom (5 August 2015 – 2016)
 Marvin Marvin
 Max & Shred
 Nicky, Ricky, Dicky & Dawn
 School of Rock
 See Dad Run
 Supah Ninjas
 The Haunted Hathaways
 The Thundermans
 The Troop
 True Jackson, VP
 iCarly
 Victorious 
 You Gotta See This
 Wendell & Vinnie
 WITS Academy (23 November 2016 – 2016)
 What's Up Warthogs!

Opening and closing times (Over now)
Nickelodeon used to sign-on at 6:00 AM and sign-off at 12:00 AM. Nowadays, Nickelodeon Israel is always on air, broadcasting SpongeBob SquarePants in the English dub for 6 hours from midnight to 6 AM.

References

External links
 Official Site 

Israel
Television channels in Israel
Television channels and stations established in 2003
Children's television networks
2003 establishments in Israel
Television channels and stations established in 1996
1996 establishments in Israel